Blood Dolls is a 1999 direct-to-video comedy horror film written and directed by Charles Band. The film stars Jack Maturin, Debra Mayer, and Nicholas Worth. The story was conceived by Band (using the name Robert Talbot).

Plot
Virgil Travis is a wealthy psychopath who lives in seclusion in his mansion with his little person butler (Phil Fondacaro) and his murderous, clown make-up-wearing henchman. Tortured and mutated as a child by a woman who put him through body transforming procedures, Virgil has an abnormally sized head. Basking in the suffering, degradation, and death of others, Virgil has already kidnapped an all-female rock group who he keeps imprisoned to satisfy his perverse amusement. He creates a trio of twisted living dolls (Pimp, Sideshow, and Ms. Fortune) to murder those who have wronged him; Virgil doesn't anticipate meeting his match and finding love, both of which come in the form of a woman who is even more evil and twisted than he.

The film has two different endings:
 After his new wife sees his deformed head, she is horrified, so the dolls attack her while Virgil has the house filled with poison gas. Ms. Fortune frees the rock group, who escape with the dolls.
 Rather than be disgusted, she finds him attractive for his evil and intellect. She then says that together, the world is theirs for the taking.

Cast
 Jack Maturin as Virgil Travis
 Debra Mayer as Moira Yulin
 William Paul Burns as Mr. Mascaro
 Warren Draper as Harrison Yulin
 Nicholas Worth as George Warbeck
 Jodie Coady as Mercy Shaw
 Phil Fondacaro as Hylas
 Naomi McClure as Cindy Agami
 Jack Forbes as Squires
 Jason Pace as Howard Loftus
 J. Paradee as Shirley
 Venesa Talor as Cotton Baby
 Yvette Lera as Razor Baby
 Persia White as Black Baby
 Matt Corboy as Warbeck Security
 Beth Fisher as Woman Security
 Merritt Bailey as Security Guy #1
 Richard Ecks as Security Guy #2
 Mike McDuffie as Security Guy #3

Reception
Will Kouf of Silver Emulsion Film Reviews writes in his review:

Documentary
A documentary of the making of the film, titled Hollywierd, was directed by Penelope Spheeris in 1999, although it currently does not have a home video release.

Music
Blood Dolls was originally planned in conjunction with music magnate Miles Copeland, and was to be hyped with a soundtrack album and concert tour for the sexy girl rockers who appear as secondary characters in the film but various difficulties caused this plan to collapse.
Most songs in the movie are played by the fictional girls band called the CAGED BABYS but other than the main score composer Ricardo Bizzetti there are no music credits at all. However there's an official music video of one of the songs called PAIN performed by Go-Go's guitarist Jane Wiedlin, Alex Lloyd and Rick Astley.

See also
 Killer toy

References

External links
 

1999 films
American supernatural horror films
Films directed by Charles Band
Films about dolls
Films about sentient toys
Puppet films
Films set in country houses
Horror films about toys
Sentient toys in fiction
1990s English-language films
1990s American films